C46 is a secondary route in northern Namibia that runs from Ruacana, near the border with Angola, to the B1 trunk road at Ondangwa.

It has a junction with the C41 road in Outapi.

References 

Roads in Namibia